The McDonald's 1984 Olympics promotion was a food giveaway blunder that ended up costing the fast-food restaurant chain much more than expected, when the Soviet Union and their Eastern Bloc countries boycotted the 1984 Summer Olympics in Los Angeles, California.

History
With a history of using athletic prowess to sell fast food products, the McDonald's restaurant chain purchased major sponsor status for the 1984 Los Angeles Olympics, in addition to sponsoring several American teams competing at the event. McDonald's also invested in a major advertising campaign around the event. In addition to the sponsorships and advertising, McDonald's prepared to repeat a successful giveaway promotion they deployed during the 1976 Summer Olympics in Montréal, Quebec, Canada, where customers were offered a chance to win products when the American team won a medal.

In preparation for the promotion, McDonald's had scratch-off cards printed with different Olympic events. The cards were handed to customers at concessions in the United States and they could be redeemed for a specific food item if the American Olympic Team won a medal at that specific event. A gold medal was worth a Big Mac, silver an order of french fries, and bronze a Coca-Cola. The slogan "When the U.S. Wins, You Win." was adopted for the campaign. McDonald's had made their cost estimates for the promotion based on the American medal count at the 1976 Montreal Olympics, which was 94 medals, this included 34 gold medals.

McDonald's promotion campaign was given an unexpected boost when the Soviet Union, along with the thirteen Eastern Bloc countries, boycotted the 1984 Los Angeles Olympics in retaliation for the United States' boycotting of the 1980 Summer Olympics in Moscow, Russia as a protest against the Soviet Invasion of Afghanistan. Iran and Libya also declined to participate for other reasons. With several of the Olympic powerhouse teams absent, the U.S. easily dominated the Olympic Games and walked away with 174 medals, 83 of them were gold.

As the Games started and the American teams conquered podiums, customers were enthusiastic about exchanging their cards for free food. More cards were being handed out with each new order, offering more giveaway opportunities. Some 6,600 outlets reportedly faced shortages of the promoted items, especially the Big Macs.

McDonald's have been discreet about the cost of the promotion, saying only it was the most expensive promotion in the franchise's history to date. Marketing experts estimate it in the millions of dollars, especially since the chain normally makes a generous profit on each of the Big Macs it was now handing out for free.

Despite the financial costs incurred in 1984, McDonald's repeated the "When the U.S. Wins, You Win" food prize promotion using the same game-piece format in both 1988 and 1996. McDonald's would continue its partnership with the Olympic Games until 2017.

Cultural references 
The campaign was parodied in an episode from the fourth season of The Simpsons television series, "Lisa's First Word". In a side-story, Krusty the Clown does a promotion for the 1984 Olympic Games with his Krusty Burger chain. The promotion is a "scratch-and-win" game, similar to McDonald's, where customers can win free Krusty Burgers if the American Olympic Team wins a gold medal, but unknown to the public, the game cards are rigged to feature events that athletes from Communist countries are most likely to win. However, when Krusty receives word of the Soviet boycott, his promotional scheme backfires and he ended up losing $44 million from all the free Krusty Burgers given to the citizens of Springfield. On the last day of the Olympic Games, a furious Krusty appears on live TV, smoking and crying, calling his customers "pigs" and vows to personally spit in every fiftieth Krusty Burger, to which Homer Simpson replies "I like those odds!".

References

1984 in the United States
1984 Summer Olympics
Marketing in the United States
History of McDonald's